Nicola Colombo (born 10 May 1968) is an Italian businessman, chairman of A.C. Monza Brianza 1912 from 2015 to 2018.

He is the son of the past owner of AC Milan, Felice Colombo.

References

External links
Site of his business activity

1968 births
Living people
People from Monza
Italian football chairmen and investors
21st-century Italian businesspeople
Sportspeople from Monza